Blackport is an Icelandic television drama miniseries, written by Gísli Örn Garðarsson, Björn Hlynur Haraldsson and Mikael Torfason and produced by Vesturport in association with RÚV. The first episode of the eight part series premiered on the RÚV (TV channel) on 26 December 2021.

Synopsis
The series takes place from 1983 to 1991 and follows a married couple, Harpa and Grimur, who buy an old trawler with their childhood friends and build a small fishing empire in a village in the Westfjords of Iceland. All goes well until the Icelandic government starts enforcing new restrictive fishing quotas which turn their lives upside down and result in a feud of jealousy, greed and betrayal.

Cast and characters
 Nína Dögg Filippusdóttir as Harpa
 Gísli Örn Garðarsson as Jón Hjaltalín
 Björn Hlynur Haraldsson as Grímur
 Guðjón Davíð Karlsson as Einar
 Unnur Ösp Stefánsdóttir as Freydís
 Anna Svava Knútsdóttir as Ella Stína
 Kristín Þóra Haraldsdóttir as Tinna
 Selma Björnsdóttir as Gunný
 Hilmir Snær Guðnason as Smári
 Pétur Jóhann Sigfússon as Gils
 Steinunn Ólína Þorsteinsdóttir as Jóna Margrét
 Sverrir Þór Sverrisson as Pétur
 Ingvar Eggert Sigurðsson as Torfi
 Jóhann Sigurðarson as Sólon
 Jógvan Hansen as Þrándur
 Benedikt Erlingsson as Steingrímur Hermannsson
 Björgvin Franz Gíslason as Hemmi Gunn
 Björn Stefánsson as Laddi/Elsa Lund

Episodes

Production
Filming started in 2020 and took place in Reykjavík and in the Westfjords.

Reception
According to a poll by Prósent, 57% of the Icelandic population watched the first episode of the show with 88% giving it a positive review. Following the shows première, Independence Party parliamentarian Ásmundur Friðriksson criticised the show for its portrayal of the rural people of Iceland.

Awards
In September 2021, the series won the Grand Prize at the 2021 Series Mania festival. In November it won the jury prize at the Serielizados Fest in Spain. On 2 February 2022, the Nordisk Film & TV Fond announced that Gísli Örn Gardarsson, Björn Hlynur Haraldsson and Mikael Torfason, writers of Blackport, where the recipients of the 2022 Nordic TV Drama Screenplay Award.

References

External links
 Verbúðin at RÚV
 

Icelandic-language television shows
2020s Icelandic television series
Icelandic drama television series
Television shows set in Iceland
RÚV original programming